Juan Manuel Pérez Ruiz (born 15 July 1996) is a Spanish footballer who plays for SD Huesca as a goalkeeper.

Club career
Born in Almudévar, Huesca, Aragon, Pérez joined CA Osasuna's youth setup in June 2013 at the age of 16, from SD Huesca. On 26 October 2014 he made his senior debut with the reserves, starting in a 2–1 Tercera División home win against CD Iruña.

On 8 June 2017, Pérez agreed to a professional contract, but remained appearing regularly with the B's. On 19 August 2018, as both first-team goalkeepers Sergio Herrera and Rubén Martínez were injured, he made his professional debut by starting in a 0–1 away loss against RCD Mallorca in the Segunda División.

On 27 November 2019, Pérez renewed his contract until 2022, and made his La Liga debut four days later, starting in a 4–2 away defeat of RCD Espanyol.

On 20 January 2023, Pérez signed a three-and-a-half-year contract with SD Huesca in division two.

Career statistics

Club

Honours
Osasuna
Segunda División: 2018–19

References

External links

1996 births
Living people
People from Hoya de Huesca
Sportspeople from the Province of Huesca
Spanish footballers
Footballers from Aragon
Association football goalkeepers
La Liga players
Segunda División players
Segunda División B players
Tercera División players
CA Osasuna B players
CA Osasuna players
SD Huesca footballers